On November 2, 1982, the District of Columbia held an election for its mayor. It resulted in the reelection of incumbent Democratic mayor Marion Barry to a second term, defeating Republican candidate E. Brooke Lee.

Results

Democratic primary
The primary occurred on September 14, 1982.

See also
 Electoral history of Marion Barry

References

mayor
Washington, D.C.
1982
Washington, D.C.